Talley v. California, 362 U.S. 60 (1960), was a case in which the Supreme Court of the United States voided a Los Angeles city ordinance which forbade the distribution of any handbills in any place under any circumstances if the handbills did not contain the name and address of the person for whom it was prepared, distributed, or sponsored.

Talley is often cited for the proposition that identification requirements burden speech.

The Importance of Anonymous Speech
Talley v. California is notable for its exposition on anonymous speech. While looking at  historical applications of anonymous speech, the court points to two uses in particular that influenced their decision. 
 Fear of Retaliation - Speaking anonymously protects those that criticize oppressive practices from the oppressors.
 Focus on the Message - Listeners focus on the message rather than the messenger when speech is anonymous.

Dissent
Although the dissent also saw the important protections of anonymous speech, it did not see any danger in this particular instance. The right to speak anonymously had to weigh against the benefit of the public knowing the author. As the dissent saw no evidence that any harm would come to Talley by revelation of his identity, the public knowledge outweighed Talley's right to anonymous speech.

See also
 List of United States Supreme Court cases
 Lists of United States Supreme Court cases by volume
 List of United States Supreme Court cases, volume 362
 Anonymous Online Speakers v. United States District Court for the District of Nevada
 McIntyre v. Ohio Elections Commission

References

External links

United States Supreme Court cases
United States Supreme Court cases of the Warren Court
United States Free Speech Clause case law
Legal history of California
1960 in United States case law
1960 in California
Civil rights movement case law